Nandakini is a river and is one of the six main tributaries of the Ganges. Originating in the glaciers below Nanda Ghunti on the Nanda Devi Sanctuary, the river joins the Alaknanda at Nandprayag (870m), which is one of the panch prayags or holy confluences on the Alaknanda.

References

Tributaries of the Ganges